
Hubbard Glacier (Lingít: Sít' Tlein) is a glacier located in Wrangell–St. Elias National Park and Preserve in eastern Alaska and Kluane National Park and Reserve in Yukon, Canada, and named after Gardiner Hubbard.

Geography 

Before it reaches the sea, Hubbard is joined by the Valerie Glacier to the west, which, through forward surges of its own ice, has contributed to the advance of the ice flow that experts believe will eventually dam the Russell Fjord from Disenchantment Bay waters.

The Hubbard Glacier ice margin has continued to advance for about a century. In May 1986, the Hubbard Glacier surged forward, blocking the outlet of Russell Fjord and creating Russell Lake. All that summer, the new lake filled with runoff; its water level rose , and the decrease in salinity threatened its sea life.

Around midnight on October 8, the dam began to give way. In the next 24 hours, an estimated  of water gushed through the gap, and the fjord was reconnected to the ocean at its previous level. This was the largest glacial lake outburst flood (GLOF) in recorded history.

In spring 2002, the glacier again approached Bert Point. It pushed a terminal moraine ahead of its face and closed the opening again in July. The fjord could become dammed again, and perhaps permanently. If this happens, the fjord could overflow its southern banks and drain through the Situk River instead, threatening trout habitat and a local airport.

It takes about 400 years for ice to traverse the length of the glacier, meaning that the ice at the foot of the glacier is about 400 years old. The glacier routinely calves off icebergs the size of a ten-story building. Where the glacier meets the bay, most of the ice is below the waterline, and newly calved icebergs can shoot up quite dramatically, so that ships must keep their distance from the edge of the glacier in Disenchantment Bay.

Collision

On June 25 2022, the cruise ship Norwegian Sun collided into a growler (a piece of ice smaller than an iceberg) in foggy conditions as it approached the Hubbard Glacier for sightseeing. The ship was damaged but it was considered safe. It cut its cruise itinerary short and sailed back to Juneau for assessment, and then Seattle for repairs without further incident.

MV Hubbard

The Alaska Marine Highway System ferry MV Hubbard is named after Hubbard Glacier. This name was chosen by local student Taylor Thompson, whose essay won Alaska's name-the-new-ferry contest.

See also
Glacial lake outburst flood
Ice calving

References

Gallery

External links
 Earthshots: Satellite Images of Environmental Change, U.S. Geological Survey
 Google Maps: Interactive satellite view of where Hubbard Glacier meets the sea
 U.S. Geological Survey: Sequence of photographs showing the 2002 ice blockage and breakthrough

Glaciers of Yukon
Glaciers of Alaska
Glaciers of Yakutat City and Borough, Alaska
Wrangell–St. Elias National Park and Preserve